Ambatomainty is a rural town in western Madagascar. It is the principal town in the Ambatomainty District, Melaky Region, approximately 220 kilometres north-west of the capital Antananarivo.

It is served by Ambatomainty Airport and the unpaved National road 8c from Morafenobe (108 km).

References

Populated places in Melaky